Laishan District is a district of the city of Yantai, Shandong province.

Administrative divisions
As 2012, this district is divided to 7 subdistricts.
Subdistricts

Education
Korean School in Yantai is in Laishan District.

See also
Yantai Laishan International Airport

References

External links 
 Information page

County-level divisions of Shandong
Yantai